John Lehr (born 1974 in Baltimore, Maryland) is an American photographer active in New York City.

About 
Lehr graduated with a B.F.A. from the Maryland Institute College of Art (MICA) in 1998 and earned his M.F.A. from Yale University in 2005.

Institutions that have displayed Lehr's art include the Museum of Modern Art, New York; Corcoran Gallery of Art,  Washington, D.C.; the Walker Art Center, Minneapolis, Minnesota; Yale University School of Art, New Haven, Connecticut and Yancey Richardson Gallery, New York.

In a review in The Brooklyn Rail of Lehr's work at Kate Werble Gallery in late 2010, Gail Braddock Quagliata writes, "Detached and structured, the images seem free to celebrate the blatant absurdity of all manner of visual signifiers, both intentional and accidental, without the burden of melodrama."

Lehr is Associate Professor in the Photography Department at Pratt Institute. Previously, he was a lecturer in the Photography department of the Yale School of Art since 2005.

References

External links
Official Portfolio Site
Walker Art Center Artist Information
Corcoran Biennial Information

1975 births
American photographers
American contemporary artists
Living people
Yale School of Art alumni
Maryland Institute College of Art alumni
Photographers from New York City